Thowra Assembly constituency is one of the 126 assembly constituencies of Assam Legislative Assembly. Thowra forms part of the Jorhat Lok Sabha constituency.
The main area is located around a tea garden known as Thowra Tea Estate. As such, though it is one of the many tea gardens in Assam, it boasts of having a golf field. However recently, the field lacks maintenance and is a common grazing ground.

Members of Legislative Assembly 

 1957: Durgeswar Saikia, Indian National Congress
 1962: Durgeswar Saikia, Indian National Congress
 1967: Durgeswar Saikia, Indian National Congress
 1972: Narau Kamar, Indian National Congress
 1978: Jogen Gogoi, Communist Party of India
 1983: Tankeswar Dehingia, Indian National Congress
 1985: Barki Prasad Telenga, Asom Gana Parishad
 1991: Devananda Konwar, Indian National Congress
 1996: Debananda Konwar, Indian National Congress
 2001: Debananda Konwar, Indian National Congress
 2006: Kushal Dowari, Independent
 2011: Sushanta Borgohain, Indian National Congress
 2016: Kushal Dowari, Bharatiya Janata Party
 2021: Sushanta Borgohain, Indian National Congress
 2021 by-poll: Sushanta Borgohain, Bharatiya Janata Party

Election results

2021 bypoll

2021 result

2016 result

External links 
 

Assembly constituencies of Assam